Stan Smith (born 1946) is an American tennis player.

Stan or Stanley Smith may also refer to:

Sportspeople
Stan Smith (footballer, born 1884) (1884–1956), English footballer who played for Southampton
Stan Smith (footballer, born 1931) (1931–2010), English footballer who played for Port Vale, Crewe Alexandra and Oldham Athletic
Stan Smith (Australian footballer, born 1925), Australian footballer for Collingwood
Stan Smith (Australian footballer, born 1932) (1932–2012), Australian footballer for South Melbourne
Stanley Smith (rugby league, born c. 1910), rugby league footballer of the 1920s and 1930s for Great Britain, England, Wakefield Trinity, and Leeds
Stanley Smith (rugby league, born 1937) (1937–2012), rugby league footballer of the 1950s and 1960s for Wakefield Trinity and Bramley
Stanley Smith (racing driver) (1949–2020), NASCAR driver and dirt-track racer
Stanley Smith (cricketer) (1910–1984), Australian cricketer
Stanley Smith (cyclist) (born 1952), Barbadian cyclist

Other
Stan Smith (American Dad!), fictional main character of the animated television series American Dad!
Stan Smith (economist) (born 1946), American economist
Stan Smith (criminal) (1937–2010), Australian criminal
Adidas Stan Smith, tennis shoe made by Adidas and named for the tennis player
Stanley P. Smith (1861–1931), British Protestant Christian missionary to China
Stanley Smith (geologist) (1883–1955), British geologist and academic
Stanley Wyatt Smith (1887–1958), Consul-General of Manila, and of Honolulu
Stanley Smith (actor), actor in films including Queen High
Stanley Smith (surveyor), attempted to investigate a potential route from the head of the Lillooet River to the coast, see Canadian Pacific Survey